The Edmund Rice Administration Wing, commonly known as The Castle, is a heritage listed building located on Mount Henry Road in Salter Point and the focal point of the Aquinas College Campus. Built in 1937, the Castle was the first building completed on the campus. The building is owned by the Christian Brothers as part of the Aquinas College property.

History 
The Castle was designed by Cavanagh and Cavanagh, and built over several stages; the tower and south wing were first to be completed in 1937. The north wing, anticipated in the original plans, was designed by Henderson & Thompson and completed in 1967. Deliberate efforts were made to design the north wing to echo the style, form and established materials of the original south wing, presenting visually, a three-storey façade, which cleverly conceal what is actually a four-storey building.

The Castle was funded largely by donations and from money obtained from the sale of some of the original  purchased by the Christian Brothers in 1928.

The Castle was heritage listed by the Heritage Council of Western Australia on 1 May 1989.

Gallery

References

Further reading 
 Florey, Cecil (2000), Canning Bridge to Clontarf: An Historical Journey Along Manning Road
 Massam, Katharine (1998). On High Ground: Images of One Hundred Years at Aquinas College, Western Australia University of Western Australia Press 

Aquinas College, Perth
State Register of Heritage Places in the City of South Perth